Willerwald is a commune in the Moselle department in Grand Est in north-eastern France.

Geography
Willerwald is a town of about 1,500 inhabitants located 12 km south of Sarreguemines. The A4 motorway is 1 km from Willerwald. Located on a hill between Sarralbe and Hambach, the village developed along a north–south axis represented today by the RN 61. A dozen streets are perpendicular to this axis. This weft pattern weaves an original but widely dispersed urban morphology. In parallel to the RN 61 but bypassing the village, the railway line serving the Hambach Europole crosses the town.

Despite its name, the municipality does not have a forest. Three streams cross the town: the Hoppbach, the Waldscheingraben and the Dorrenbach. The town is also crossed by the channel of the Saar and Sarre coal mines.

History
A first village named Weiler / Alberweiller  or Albweiler was known as early as the 13th century. It was destroyed in the sixteenth century. Since 1601, a new village began to rise on the old ban cleared. In 1766 Willerwald passed with the duchy of Lorraine under the sovereignty of France, and the Prince of Saarbrücken surrendered to France the property which he possessed at Willer.

A first church, dedicated to Saint Nicholas, was built in 1777.
A new Gothic church, with a 60-meter belfry, was built between 1910 and 1911, and was solemnly consecrated on May 15, 1911. Damaged by war on June 6, 1940, it was totally demolished during the occupation.

During the Second World War, the village was evacuated on 1 September 1939 in the department of Charente (Salles-d'Angles, then Châteaubernard and Saint-Félix). The village was bombed on 14 June 1940 and occupied by German troops on 15 June 1940.
Also bombed on December 4, 1944, 47 houses were completely destroyed and the others severely damaged. It was liberated by the US Army on December 5, 1944.

Politics and administration

Population

See also
 Communes of the Moselle department

References

External links
 

Communes of Moselle (department)